Mohammad Ghouse Baba (born 6 September 1978) is an Indian former cricketer. He played nine first-class matches for Hyderabad between 2000 and 2004.

See also
 List of Hyderabad cricketers

References

External links
 

1978 births
Living people
Indian cricketers
Hyderabad cricketers
People from Mahbubnagar